Gilford R. Duggan was a professional football player in the National Football League and later the All-America Football Conference. He played in the NFL from 1940 to 1945. He played for the New York Giants, Chicago Cardinals and "Card-Pitt", a team that was the result of a temporary merger between the Cardinals and the Pittsburgh Steelers. The teams' merger was result of the manning shortages experienced league-wide due to World War II. In 1946, Duggan jumped to the rival AAFC, where he played with the Los Angeles Dons in 1946 and the Buffalo Bills in 1947.

References

1910s births
Players of American football from Arkansas
New York Giants players
Chicago Cardinals players
Card-Pitt players
Los Angeles Dons players
Buffalo Bills (AAFC) players
Oklahoma Sooners football players
1974 deaths
People from Benton, Arkansas